A burlap sack or gunny sack, also known as a gunny shoe, hessian sack or tow sack, is a bag, traditionally made of fibres which are also known as "tow," such as hessian fabric (burlap) formed from jute, hemp or other natural fibres. Modern-day versions of these sacks are often made from synthetic fabrics such as polypropylene.

The word gunny, meaning coarse fabric, is of Indo-Aryan origin. In Australia, these sacks, made of Indian jute, were known traditionally as 'hessian sacks', 'hessian bags' or 'sugar bags'. The term tow sack refers to their being made of tow, spun broken fibres of hemp or other plants.

Gunny sacks are sometimes used as sandbags for erosion control, especially in emergencies. Up until the latter part of the twentieth century, when they became less common, the sacks were one of the primary tools for fighting grass fires in rural areas, used while soaked with water when available. Gunny sacks are also popular in the traditional children's game of sack racing.

Size
Although gunny sacks are no longer used to carry them, the common measurement unit of potatoes is still the "sack" among farmers in Idaho, United States.

See also
Flour sack
 Coffee bag

Cultural references 
 Referred to as a "tow sack" in "Polk Salad Annie" by Tony Joe White.
 Referred to in the lyrics of Chuck Berry's "Johnny B. Goode" - "He used to carry his guitar in a gunny sack". Indicative of the character's poverty.
 In "Wizard People, Dear Reader", the package containing the Philosopher’s Stone is referred to as a "silly little gunny sack" by Brad Neely.

References

Bags
Food packaging
Jute